The Philips NMS-8250, (NMS is short for "New Media Systems") was a professional MSX 2 home computer for the high end market, with two built in floppy disk drives in a "pizza box" configuration.  The machine was in fact manufactured by Sanyo and it is basically the MPC-25FS with a different color.

It featured professional video output possibilities, such as SCART for a better picture quality, and a detachable keyboard.

Technical specifications 
Processor
 Zilog Z80A with a clock speed of 3,56 MHz.
Memory
ROM: 64 kB
MSX 2: 48 kB
Disk BASIC: 16 kB
RAM: 256 kB
VRAM: 128 kB
Main memory: 128 kB
Display
VDP
Yamaha YM9938
text: 80×24, 40×24 and 32×24 (characters per line × lines) four colors, two foreground colors and two background colors
graphical: resolution max 512×212 pixels (16 colors 512) and 256×212 (256 colors)
colors: 512 max
Controller chip
MSX-Engine: S-3527
real-time clock with rechargeable battery 
Sound
PSG (S-3527)
 3 sound channels, one noise channel
floppy disk station
dimensions: 3,5 inch
capacity: 720 kB (double sided)
Connectors
mains cable
RF-output
CVBS monitor
luminance video output connector (for monochrome monitors) 
tulip (RCA) connector audio output
SCART audio/video-output using RGB
data recorder
Centronics compatible Parallel port for a printer
detachable keyboard connector
2 joysticks
2 cartridge slots

MSX